Spirit Falls is an unincorporated community in the town of Tomahawk, Lincoln County, Wisconsin, United States.

Climate
The Köppen Climate Classification subtype for this climate is "Dfb" (Warm Summer Continental Climate).

Notes

Unincorporated communities in Lincoln County, Wisconsin
Unincorporated communities in Wisconsin